The Council of Magickal Arts, Inc. (CMA) is a Neo-pagan organization in Texas, and runs one of the USA's largest bi-annual Neo-pagan festivals in the Southern United States.

History
Founded in 1980, the CMA is a 501(c)(3) non-profit corporation, registered in the state of Texas. CMA's festivals are held on a  parcel of land called Spirit Haven Ranch, which is owned by the corporation. CMA produces an online quarterly newsletter, The Accord. CMA promotes spirituality based on Pagan beliefs, and is open to people of all traditions who are interested in celebrating nature, spirit and community.

Starting out as a joint camping event of several covens and some solitary practitioners, as of 2012, CMA had a membership of nearly 1000 people and festival attendance of 500 or more at each festival.

The Accord
The Accord is the online quarterly periodical of the corporation, and contains a wide range of articles by members. In the past The Accord was a medium quality magazine periodical with national distribution, but printing costs and the expenses of land ownership have caused CMA to move to a paperless, online publication, which may be read on the corporation's website www.magickal-arts.org. .pdf format.

Festivals
CMA hosts a Beltane and Samhain Festival every year. These are generally held a couple of weeks before Beltaine and Samhain. This is allows for members of The Council of Magickal Arts to celebrate the solar holidays in their own personal ways and to not compete with other pagan festivals and events that are of interest to their membership. CMA are known for their Beltane and Samhain Festivals. CMA also works closely with the Pagan Pride Day organization and helps to organize the Pagan Pride Day Events in Cities across Texas. 

For many years the festivals were held at a commercial camping property in the hill country of Austin, Texas. In 1999 CMA purchased land of their own, called SpiritHaven, located near the community of Cistern in Central Texas.

A typical festival starts with setup on Wednesday for vendors and early arrivals.  The main attendees arrive on Thursday, Friday, and Saturday.  Each night a public main ritual is held, presented by different volunteer members and their groups (covens, kindreds, groves, etc.), and, weather permitting, a bonfire (Revel) is lit.  The bonfire serves as the main public area for those who wish to stay up late into the night, drumming, dancing, and talking.  Personal and group campsites also host gatherings at night.

During the daylight hours of Friday and Saturday, a full schedule of workshops are presented, some by members and some by guest presenters which, in the past, has included such notables as Patricia Telesco, Fritz Jung and Wren (of The Witches' Voice), Morning Glory Zell-Ravenheart, and more.

Along with the workshops and the evening rituals and bonfire, the main stage is used to present regional and national Pagan artists, such as; Wendy Rule, Tuatha Dea, Ginger Doss, Dreamtrybe (formerly Velvet Hammer), Canvas, Spoonfed Tribe, SONA, Lisa Thiel, Darwin Davis, Spiral Dance, and others.

The corporation's business meeting, called Great Works, is held on Sunday after the festival.

SpiritHaven
Often referred to as, simply, "The Land", Spirit Haven Ranch is  just outside the town of Cistern, Texas, which is a few miles north of IH-10 and the town of Flatonia, Texas. Although some improvements have been made, such as a water well and electricity for some critical needs such as a First Aid Building, and Ritual Areas, the land is mostly rough. The camping areas are wooded with Mesquites and other native trees, while the Sacred Spaces are more densely wooded with oaks and other native trees.

Maintenance between festivals, and the majority of the work to ready the land for each festival, is done by the volunteers of the Spirit Haven Ranch Team, and all members are welcome to come out on the work weekends as part of the team, as well as interested persons wanting to learn more about CMA.

Tent camping is the only form of lodging available at Spirit Haven Ranch. RV space is limited and without amenities.
Members may reserve campsites on a yearly basis, reserving their group's placement during Festivals. These sites are reserved for the reservation holder and their associates.

References

External links
Council of Magickal Arts

Festivals in Texas
Modern pagan organizations based in the United States
Modern pagan festivals
Religion in Texas
Religious organizations based in the United States
Religious organizations established in 1980
Modern pagan organizations established in the 1980s